L'Animale is a 2018 Austrian coming-of-age drama film written and directed by Katharina Mückstein. The film made its world premiere at the 68th Berlin Film Festival in the Panorama section on 18 February 2018. It was released in theaters in Austria by Polyfilm Verleih on 16 March 2018. The film received six nominations for the Austrian Film Award, including Best Film and Best Actress.

Plot
In rural Austria, 18-year-old Mati is a tomboy who struggles with gender identity and sexuality, only hangs out with boys and is a member of a motocross gang that causes trouble in the region. Mati's best friend, Sebastian, suddenly wants to be more than a friend, at the same time that Mati meets Carla, a self-confident girl who is completeley different from her. Meanwhile, Mati's parents struggle with a long-kept secret.

Cast 
 Sophie Stockinger as Mati
 Kathrin Resetarits as Mutter
 Dominik Warta as Vater
 Julia Franz Richter as Carla
 Jack Hofer as Sebastian
 Dominic Marcus Singer as Kogler
 Simon Morzé as Mark
 Stefan Pohl as Felix

Production 
The film was co-produced by the Nikolaus Geyrhalter Filmproduktion and La Banda Film. Director Katharina Mückstein also wrote the screenplay for the film. The score was composed by Bernhard Fleischmann.

The title, L'Animale, comes from the 1985 Italian song of the same name performed by Franco Battiato, which is featured in the film.

Director Katharina Mückstein wrote the role of Mati especially for Sophie Stockinger. L'Animale marks their second collaboration following the 2013 film Talea. Mückstein said she wanted to write another screenplay featuring Stockinger. "I always knew that L'Animale would be about a young girl and I also wanted to talk about the conflict we face between rationality and passion. I knew that it would be a feminist film that dealt with gender and gender identity, because I studied gender before going to film school. I worked on the screenplay for two years, and the story underwent a lot of changes before reaching its final form".

Stockinger had to learn to ride a bike for the motorcross scenes.

Mückstein said in a director's statement that L'Animale is her personal answer to the question of how free we, as modern people, really are. She said: "We want to please and be respected. We are sensitive and are often afraid. However, authenticity requires confrontation, emancipation demands effort, progress needs courage. Individual resistance, the courage to liberate one's identity and sexuality… is the greatest revolutionary potential in our times."

Filming 
Filming began in Vienna, Austria on 8 July 2016 and wrapped on 23 September 2016.

The shooting locations in Lower Austria, where the shoot took place in September 2016, included a farm in Gablitz and a house in Pressbaum, both communities bordering the community of Purkersdorf. In Pressbaum, a modern house that was almost completely built was chosen as Matis' parents' house. Regarding the choice of locations in Lower Austria, Mückstein explained: "Places also radiate something between the lines, you can tell whether it's near a city or very far away. Here it was important to tell the story of the outskirts of the commuter belt, where young people have an idea of the city but don't regularly go there where there are many new influences."

Release 
The first trailer for the film was unveiled on 5 February 2018. The film made its world premiere at the 68th Berlin Film Festival on 18 February 2018 in the Panorama section, and it also competed for Teddy Award, a separate section from the festival. It was released in theaters in Austria by Polyfilm Verleih on 16 March 2018. The film was screened at AFI Fest 2018 as part of the New Auteurs section.

Reception 
Rotten Tomatoes gives the film a score of 86% based on 7 reviews, with a weighted average of 7/10.

Awards and nominations

References

External links 
 Official site
 

2018 films
Austrian drama films
2018 drama films
2010s German-language films
2018 independent films
2010s feminist films
2010s coming-of-age films
Austrian independent films
Teen LGBT-related films
LGBT-related coming-of-age films
Austrian LGBT-related films
Films shot in Vienna
Motorcycle racing films
2018 LGBT-related films
LGBT-related drama films
Films directed by Katharina Mückstein